"Big Shiny Tunes 5" is the fifth edition of the MuchMusic compilation series,  Big Shiny Tunes. The album contains six songs that reached #1 on Canada's Rock chart in 2000 ("Bent", "Load Me Up", "Kryptonite", "Take a Picture", "Wonderful" and "Otherside"), more than any other Big Shiny Tunes album released before the chart's discontinuation.

Commercial performance
Big Shiny Tunes 5 debuted at #2 on the Canadian Albums Chart, selling 68,899 copies in its first week. The album sold 79,657 copies the next week and 83,469 copies the week after. The album sold 424,393 copies by the end of 2000 and was the eighth best-selling album of the year in Canada. The album reached #1 on the Canadian Albums Chart in January, 2001. The album was certified 6× Platinum (600,000 units) by the CRIA.

Track listing
Matchbox Twenty - "Bent" - (4:18)
Matthew Good Band - "Load Me Up" - (3:41)
3 Doors Down - "Kryptonite" - (3:54)
Stone Temple Pilots - "Sour Girl" - (4:15)
Bloodhound Gang - "The Bad Touch" - (3:38)
Treble Charger - "American Psycho" - (3:23)
Filter - "Take a Picture" - (4:23)
Everclear - "Wonderful" - (4:19)
Blink-182 - "Adam's Song" - (4:08)
Limp Bizkit - "Re-Arranged" - (4:09)
Wheatus - "Teenage Dirtbag" - (4:02)
Red Hot Chili Peppers - "Otherside" - (4:15)
Sum 41 - "Makes No Difference" - (3:10)
Deftones - "Change (In the House of Flies)" - (3:56)
Disturbed - "Stupify" - (4:05)
J. Englishman - "More" - (3:23)
Kid Rock - "Only God Knows Why" - (4:15)
Nickelback - "Breathe"- (3:59)

References

2000 compilation albums